Michael Leinert (born 1942 in Meldorf / Schleswig-Holstein, Germany) is a well-known stage director, dramaturg, editor and author. His father, Friedrich Leinert was a respected composer (a pupil of Arnold Schönberg), conductor and Professor of Music in Hannover; Michael Leinert's mother was an operatic and concert singer.

Studies and first engagement 

Michael Leinert studied music (Oboe) at the University for Music in Detmold, German Literature and History of the Arts at the University of Munich. His teachers of Drama and Opera Direction were Professor August Everding, Professor Heinz Arnold and Professor Götz Friedrich. In 1970 he became a Dramaturg and director for drama and opera at the Theater of Kiel. Following this appointment, came further engagements as Dramaturg and stage director at the Staatstheater Braunschweig, the Hamburgische Staatsoper and at the Bayerische Staatsoper in Munich. From 1983 to 1985 he was Oberspielleiter (stage director) at the Landestheater Coburg. In 1985, Michael Leinert became the personal assistant of General-Intendant Tobias Richter at Theater Bremen.

Artistic Director and General Manager 

In 1988 he was appointed artistic director and General Manager of Pfalztheater Kaiserslautern and from 1991 to 1999 he was the artistic director and General Manager of the Staatstheater Kassel. In autumn 1999 Leinert started his position as Chefdramaturg and stage director of the Deutsche Oper am Rhein Düsseldorf-Duisburg (until summer 2006).

Since 2007 he lives with his wife, the well-known opera singer and Professor of Voice Susan Owen-Leinert in Memphis Tennessee.

International engagements 

Michael Leinert has been invited to direct plays and operas in Germany, Italy, Denmark, Russia, United States and Cyprus. He created and directed the first Cypriote Opera "Manoli" by Vassos Arghyrides and Giorgos Neophytou, also the world premiere of Ingomar Gruenauer's Amleth und Fengo in Heidelberg and Jürg Baur's first chamber opera (Libretto: M. Leinert after Anton Chechov's The novel with the contrabass), in Düsseldorf, 2005.
At Florida's Palm Beach Opera, Leinert directed successfully Samson et Dalila, Richard Wagner's Der Fliegende Holländer and Tannhäuser in 2002.

With great acclaim from International press, he directed in 2002 at the National Theatre of Cyprus in Nicosia the World Premiere of the Greek translation of Goethe's FAUST by the famous poet Nikos Kazantzakis.

At the Chamber Opera of Hamburg he directed Donizetti's Il Borgomastro di Saardam, Mozart's Le nozze di Figaro, Giovanni Paisiello's Il barbiere di Siviglia and Richard Wagner's Das Liebesverbot.

In March 2006 he produced successfully the opera Hamlet by Ambroise Thomas at the Deutsche Oper am Rhein, Düsseldorf - Duisburg.

In March 2007 he was the stage director oft the play Don Juan (play) by Molière with The Cyprus Theatre Organisation THOC in Nicosia / Cyprus.

Successful productions 

Michael Leinert's greatest international achievements as a director are:
Don Giovanni, Der Ring des Nibelungen (Staatstheater Kassel 1997–99), Tristan und Isolde, Tannhäuser, Der Fliegende Holländer (Kassel, Aachen, Festival in Heidenheim, Ferrara, Parma, Padua, Palm Beach Opera / Florida), Wozzeck, Tosca, La Bohème, Madama Butterfly, Il tabarro, Gianni Schicchi, Manon Lescaut, Rigoletto, Jenůfa, Sibelius': The Maiden in the Tower and Rachmaninov's Francesca da Rimini (First premiere in Germany), Pagliacci, Cavalleria rusticana and Ernst Krenek's Orpheus und Eurydike.

Leinert's stage direction of Ján Cikker's Das Erdbeben in Chile (First premiere in Germany. opera after the novel of Heinrich von Kleist) got the rating: "Best production of the month" from the opera magazine Orpheus International. For his stage direction of Leoncavallo's Pagliacci at the Opera house of Halle he received a nomination in the magazine Opernwelt Year Book 1994/95 (Critic's inquiry) for his "expressive stage direction".

Theatre and drama 

Michael Leinert produced many theatre plays, such as from Friedrich Schiller (Die Braut von Messina, Die Jungfrau von Orleans), Johann Wolfgang von Goethe (Faust), Witold Gombrowicz (Yvonne, Prinzessin von Burgund), Jean Racine (Phaedra) and Molière among others.
His production of Nikolaj V. Koljada's monodrama  Die Amerikanerin (The American woman) was successfully premiered in Germany, Russia and in Greek translation at Skala Theater, Larnaca, Cyprus.

Leinert was the initiator of the First European Drama Award Competition (in connection with the world's greatest exhibition for Modern Art: documenta IX in Kassel, 1992), promoted by Sir Peter Ustinov and Professor August Everding.1150 plays were submitted from 29 European countries.

Contemporary music theatre 

He performed also successfully experimental authors and modern music composers as Mauricio Kagel (Presentation, Pas de cinq, Himmelsmechanik, etc.), John Cage (Theatre piece, 4:33), Bent Lorentzen (Perogolesi's Home Service, Fackeltanz), Wilfried Hiller (IJOB - world premiere at the Bavarian State Opera of Munich, Opera Festival 1979 with Lorenz Fehenberger, tenor), Hans - Joachim Hespos (Nachtvorstellung, world premiere 1986 in Bremen/Concordia), György Ligeti (Rondeau), Jörg Wyttenbach (Streichquartett), Manfred Trojahn, Dieter Schnebel (Nostalgie - Solo for conductor without an orchestra), Manfred Niehaus, Marc Neikrug (Through roses), Karlheinz Stockhausen, Hans Jürgen von Bose (BLUTBUND, world premiere at Hamburgische Staatsoper); among others.

Translations and Composer's Biography 

Leinert translated Jean Sibelius' Maiden in the tower into the German language as well as Gaetano Donizetti's Il pazzi per progetto and Tom Johnson's The four note opera.
He has written and directed many Radio Plays, several opera libretti and three musical plays for children.

His biography of the German Romantic Composer Carl Maria von Weber is published in the fifth edition by the well-known Rowohlt Verlag (Serie Monografien) and has been translated into Swedish and Chinese.

The Spohr Society of the United States 

Together with Susan Owen-Leinert he founded the Spohr Society of the United States of America and edited the first complete and critical edition of Louis Spohr’s Lieder in 12 vols. with the publisher Dohr in Cologne, Germany.

Michael Leinert has taught as a Guest Professor of Opera History and Opera Literature and Drama at the Universities of Bremen, Braunschweig, Hamburg and Munich. At Robert-Schumann-Hochschule Düsseldorf he gave lessons in stage direction for the Opera Department. He was one of the directors of the Memphis Opera & Song Academy at the University of Memphis, Tennessee, USA, a summer academy for singers.

The Chamber Opera of Memphis 

Michael Leinert was for many years the Artistic Director of several Studios for Contemporary Experimental Music Theatre in Germany, for example in Kiel, where he was also the Director of "Musica nova" (1970 - 1974); later in Braunschweig, Coburg, at the Hamburgische Staatsoper (Opera stabile), at the Bayerische Staatsoper Munich (together with Walter Haupt) and in Bremen. In Memphis, Tennessee, he founded together with his wife, Prof. Susan Owen-Leinert, the Chamber Opera of Memphis, a forum for contemporary Music Theater.

Libretti by Michael Leinert (A selection) 
 Music Theater
Friedrich Leinert Status quo. Chamber Opera. World premiere at Hannover University of Music, Drama and Media, Germany
Friedrich Leinert Eine Note nach der anderen. Chamber Opera. World premiere at Hannover University of Music, Drama and Media, Germany
Friedrich Leinert A.H. - Bilder aus einem Führerleben. Opera Collage. World premiere at Musiktheater im Revier, Gelsenkirchen, Germany
 Bent Lorentzen Fackeltanz Chamber Opera.
Bent Lorentzen A wondrous love story Tristan-Variationen. World premiere at the Bavarian State Opera Munich, Theater im Marstall.
Bent Lorentzen Pergolesi's Home Service (German version). Chamber Opera. German premiere at Staatstheater Kassel.US premiere at the Chamber Opera of Memphis, Tennessee
Bent Lorentzen Der Steppenwolf (after Hermann Hesse). Opera (Duration: 120:00). Publisher Edition_S_music-sound-art, Copenhagen.
 Music Theater – German Translations:
Jean Sibelius Die Jungfrau im Turm, Edition Wilhelm Hansen, Copenhagen.
Tom Johnson The 4 Note Opera (Vier Ton Oper), Sikorski Musikverlage, Hamburg and G. Schirmer Inc., New York.
Libretti of Operas for Children:
Das Zauberhorn after Carl Maria von Weber’s Oberon. World premiere at the Chamber opera of Hamburg.
Die Zauberflöte after Wolfgang Amadeus Mozart.
Der Freischütz und der Teufel after Carl Maria von Weber. World premiere: 28. November 2000 st Deutsche Oper am Rhein Düsseldorf-Duisburg.

References 

1. Worldcat Identities: Leinert, Michael 1942-
2. Worldcat Identities: Leinert, Michael
3. Michael Leinert's Rowohlt Monografie about Carl Maria von Weber
4. Editor: Michael Leinert
5. Michael Leinert at Wikipedia Germany
6. Authority control|VIAF

External links 

Production photos and Repertoire
The Chamber Opera of Memphis
MOSA Summer Academy for young singers
1.  European Drama Competition
Alban Berg’s Wozzeck – Review Frankfurter Allgemeine Zeitung vom 10. März 1999
 Co-Editor of the first complete edition of ‘’Lieder’’ by Louis Spohr

German theatre directors
Living people
1942 births